The Zohar is a foundational work of the Kabbalah.

Zohar may also refer to:

 Zohar (name), including a list of persons with the name
 Zohar (band), a British musical band
 Zohar (album), an album by jazz musician John Zorn
 Zohar, Israel, a village in southern Israel
 Zuhr prayer, one of the five daily prayers in Islam

See also 
 Upper Zohar, a Byzantine fortlet in Israel
 Zohar Bridge, a road bridge in Israel